The Treaty of Hudaybiyyah was an event that took place during the time of the Islamic prophet Muhammad. It was a pivotal treaty between Muhammad, representing the state of Medina, and the Qurayshi tribe of Mecca in January 628 (corresponding to Dhu al-Qi'dah, AH 6). It helped to decrease tension between the two cities, affirmed peace for a period of 10 years, and authorised Muhammad's followers to return the following year in a peaceful pilgrimage, later known as The First Pilgrimage.

Attempted pilgrimage

Muhammad had a premonition that he entered Mecca and did tawaf around the Ka'bah. His companions in Madinah were delighted when he told them about it. They all revered Mecca and the Kaaba and they learned to do tawaf there. In 628, Muhammad and a group of 1,400 Muslims marched peacefully without arms towards Mecca, in an attempt to perform the Umrah (pilgrimage). They were dressed as pilgrims, and brought sacrificial animals, hoping that the Quraish would honour the Arabian custom of allowing pilgrims to enter the city. The Muslims had left Medina in a state of ihram, a premeditated spiritual and physical state which restricted their freedom of action and prohibited fighting. This, along with the paucity of arms carried, indicated that the pilgrimage was always intended to be peaceful. 
  
Muhammad and his followers camped outside of Mecca, and Muhammad met with Meccan emissaries who wished to prevent the pilgrims' entry into Mecca. After negotiations, the two parties decided to resolve the matter through diplomacy rather than warfare, and a treaty was drawn up.

Conditional points of the treaty 
After a long discussion, both parties agreed with some conditional points, such as:

 The Messenger of Allah will have to return to Medina instead of having entered Mecca that year. The Muslim shall perform their pilgrimage in the upcoming year and they would stay in peace at Mecca for three days including the years onward with no arms except sheathed swords.
 There will be a truce between both parties for ten years, whereby during this period all the people may enjoy safety and harmony.
 Whoever wishes to enter into a covenant with the Prophet will be allowed to do so, and whoever wishes to enter into a covenant with the Quraish will be allowed to do so. Whoever enters into any one of the parties will be considered part of that party.  Likewise, any sort of aggression against them will be considered aggression against that party.
 Whoever flees to Muhammad from Mecca without the permission of his guardians will be sent back to the Quraysh, but whoever comes to the Quraysh from the Muslims will not be sent back to the Muslims. The writer of the treaty was Ali Ibn Abi Talib.

Umar's opposition
After the treaty was signed, some of the pilgrims objected to Muhammad giving in on most points to the Quraysh, use the name of Allah and call himself the Messenger of God. That led to Umar questioning points of the treaty. After that he allegedly used to regret that he used to talk to the Prophet in the manner that he had never done before. This was recorded in Sahih Muslim.

Significance
The Treaty is very important in Islam, as it was an indirect recognition of the Islamic state in Medina. The treaty also allowed the Muslims who were still in Mecca to practice Islam publicly. Further, as there was no longer a constant struggle between the Muslims and the polytheists, many people saw Islam in a new light, which led to many more people accepting Islam. In addition, the Treaty of Hudaybiyyah paved the way for the conquering of other tribes, through the use of treaties with the Muslims. The treaty also serves as an example that Islam was not merely spread with the sword as Muhammad had an army that could have attacked Mecca, but Muhammad chose to make a peace treaty. After the polytheists broke the treaty, he marched on Makkah and conquered the polytheists.

The oath that Muhammad took "under the tree" at al-Hudaybiyyah made him a true ruler over parts of western Arabia. In early Islamic Egypt, having a forefather who had "pledged allegiance under the tree" conferred considerable social prestige.

A verse of the Quran was revealed about the treaty, which means, "Verily we have granted thee a manifest victory" (Quran 48:1).

See also
Pledge of the Tree
List of treaties
Urwah ibn Masʽud

References

Further reading

 The Oxford History of Islam by John Esposito (Oxford U. Press, 1999)
 

628
Treaties of Muhammad
Muhammad in Medina
7th-century treaties